Don Capria (born 1971) is an American writer, director and artist manager. He is best known for his true-crime biography on Mafia boss Joseph Colombo.

Early life
Capria was born in Westchester County, NY. After high school he was a drummer in the hardcore punk scene in the bands; Blindside and Skarhead.

Career
Later on Capria began working as an artist manager with Hip hop and hardcore/ punk acts. In 2000, he founded the music management company 1:10 Artist Management representing artists, G Fella, Kitty Katt, Jamie Drastik and Danny Diablo A short time after he began directing music videos.
Capria wrote and directed the TV Pilot Westchester; an autobiographical story about his experiences as a manager and a music promoter. In 2014, Capria directed the short film, Eulogy, starring Federico Castelluccio. The film won "Best Ensemble" in the 2015 Queens World FIlm Festival.

1:10 Artist Management
Capria and partner, Alex Shenitsky, re-launched their music management company 1:10 Artist Management in 2012. They currently represent EDM Pop Dance artist Dawin and Trap / Punk artist Black Punk.

Bibliography
Colombo: The Unsolved Murder. 2015.

Notes

External links
 

1974 births
Living people
American film directors
American male writers
American music managers
American music video directors
Music promoters
People from Westchester County, New York
American people of Italian descent